Września railway station (German: Wreschen) is a railway station serving the town of Września, in the Greater Poland Voivodeship, Poland. The station is located on the Warsaw–Kunowice railway and Oleśnica–Chojnice railway. The train services are operated by PKP and Koleje Wielkopolskie.

The station is categorized as a grade D station. In the 1960s the station's red brick structure was plastered and repainted in beige, and the inside was completely renovated. The renovation of the façade was undertaken in December 2008. In the past, the railway station used to have a water tower.

Railway line number 3 between Warsaw, Poznań and Kunowice passes about 1.5 km north of Września station. The station is located on a branch of this line which serves the station. The station's switchboards control connections of the number 807 and 808 lines.

Train services between Gniezno, Września and Jarocin were suspended in December 2012, but they were reinstated in June 2018.

Train services
The station is served by the following service(s):

Intercity services Szczecin - Stargard - Krzyz - Poznan - Kutno - Warsaw - Lublin - Przemysl
Intercity services Szczecin - Stargard - Krzyz - Poznan - Kutno - Warsaw - Bialystok
Intercity services Zielona Gora - Zbaszynek - Poznan - Kutno - Warsaw
Intercity services Wroclaw - Ostrow Wielkopolskie - Jarocin - Poznan - Kutno - Warsaw
Intercity services Szczecin - Stargard - Krzyz - Poznan - Kutno - Lowicz - Lodz - Krakow
Intercity services Bydgoszcz - Gniezno - Poznan - Kutno - Lowicz - Lodz - Krakow
Regional services (KW) Poznan - Wrzesnia - Konin - Kutno
Regional services (KW) Gniezno - Wrzesnia - Jarocin

References

 This article is based upon a translation of the Polish language version as of July 2016.

External links
 

Railway stations in Poland opened in the 19th century
Września
Railway stations in Greater Poland Voivodeship
Railway stations served by Przewozy Regionalne InterRegio
19th-century establishments in the Province of Posen